Dao Heng Bank Group Limited was a bank holding company in Hong Kong and it had two major subsidiaries before being acquired, Dao Heng Bank Limited and Overseas Trust Bank Limited.

Dao Heng Bank Limited was established in Hong Kong in 1921. It was acquired by Guoco Group (a member of the Hong Leong Group) in 1982 and was listed on the Hong Kong Stock Exchange in 1983. In 1989, it acquired Hang Lung Bank from the Hong Kong Government. In 1993, it acquired Overseas Trust Bank from the Hong Kong Government. Instrumental in this merger, which Euromoney Magazine called "The Deal of the Year", was Managing Director Mr. Werner M. M. Makowski. A deal which led to Dao Heng Bank Group's listing on the Hong Kong Stock Exchange to be 277 times over-subscribed. On 6 December 1999, it joined to be Hang Seng Index Constituent Stocks (blue chip), making it one of the 4 leading banks that were HSI constituents. In 2001, Singaporean DBS Bank acquired Dao Heng Bank from Guoco Group, then privatized and delisted it. On 21 July 2003, DBS Bank merged Dao Heng Bank, DBS Kwong On Bank and Overseas Trust Bank to form DBS Bank (Hong Kong) Limited.

See others 
DBS Bank (Hong Kong)
Kwong On Bank
Overseas Trust Bank

References

Companies formerly listed on the Hong Kong Stock Exchange
Former companies in the Hang Seng Index
Defunct banks of Hong Kong
DBS Bank
Banks disestablished in 2003
Banks established in 1921